José Fortes Rodríguez (born 13 March 1972) is a Spanish former professional footballer who played as a defender for AZ and RBC Roosendaal in the Netherlands. He was known as a fierce defender, but saw his career cut short due to injuries and controversial episodes.

Career
Fortes Rodríguez was suspended by his former club RBC in November 2005, after saying in an interview that referee René Temmink shared features with a person suffering from Down syndrome. He was released in 2006 after the club had relegated from the Eredivisie.

After football
Since retiring from football in 2006, Fortes Rodríguez has worked as a scout for his former club AZ. He began working as an assistant to football agent Mino Raiola in May 2015, and helped broker deals for Steven Berghuis as well as representing numerous AZ players.

Career statistics

References

1972 births
Living people
People from O Carballiño (comarca)
Sportspeople from the Province of Ourense
Spanish footballers
Footballers from Galicia (Spain)
Association football defenders
Spanish expatriate footballers
Spanish expatriate sportspeople in the Netherlands
AZ Alkmaar players
RBC Roosendaal players
Eredivisie players
Eerste Divisie players
Expatriate footballers in the Netherlands